Pallene can refer to:

 Pallene (mythology), one of the seven Alkyonides, daughters of the giant Alkyoneus in Greek mythology
 Pallene (moon), a small moon of Saturn, discovered in 2004
 Pallene (Attica), a deme of ancient Attica, Greece
Pallini, a town east of Athens, Greece
Pallene, Chalcidice, the westernmost headland of the Chalcidice, Greece, also called Kassandra
Pallini, Chalcidice, a municipality in the above

See also
 Pellene, a city and polis of ancient Achaea